The Sogdian city-states refers to a number of independent or autonomous city-states in the Iranian region of Sogdia in late antiquity and the medieval period. Most of the city-states were ruled by a king or queen, who was called "first among equals". However, the succession of rule was not stable, and the people could influence who would become the new ruler. The period, which experienced its peak in the 7th century, ended with the conquest of Transoxiana by the Islamic Caliphate.

Bukhara and Samarkand – the famous cities of Persian literature – were the largest and wealthiest Sogdian states.

See also 
 Principality of Khuttal
 Principality of Chaghaniyan
 Bukhar Khudahs
 Principality of Farghana
 Principality of Ushrusana

References 

Zoroastrian rulers
Sogdians
History of Bukhara
States and territories disestablished in the 8th century